"She Never Knew Me" is a song written by Bob McDill and Wayland Holyfield, and recorded by American country music artist Don Williams.  It was released in October 1976 as the third single from the album Harmony.  The song reached number 2 on the Billboard Hot Country Singles & Tracks chart.

Chart performance

References

1976 singles
1976 songs
Don Williams songs
Songs written by Bob McDill
Songs written by Wayland Holyfield
ABC Records singles
Dot Records singles